Noise is a Canadian short drama film, directed by Greg Spottiswood and released in 2005. The film depicts a battle of wills between a boy (Cameron Lewis) who has locked himself in the family car, and his father (Hugh Thompson) who is trying to get him to come back out.

The film premiered at the NSI Film Exchange Canadian Film Festival on March 3, 2005. It was subsequently screened at the 2005 Toronto International Film Festival.

Awards

References

External links
 

2005 films
2005 short films
2005 drama films
2000s English-language films
Canadian drama short films
2000s Canadian films